Continuation is a concept in computer science.

Continuation may also refer to:

Concept
Analytic continuation, a technique in complex analysis
Numerical continuation, a method to compute approximate solutions of a system of non-linear equations 
Continuation War, the Finno-Soviet conflict during World War II
Continuing patent application, a special type of patent application
Continuation car, a special type of replica of a vehicle no longer in production by the original automaker
Continuation novel

Arts
Continuation (sculpture), a 2009 sculpture in Portland, Oregon
Continuation (album), a 1983 album by Philip Bailey
The Continuation, Deathgaze
Continuation, a 2009 album by Alex Cline

See also
Continue (disambiguation)